Senn is a term for the chief herdsman tending an Alp.
As a surname:
Alfred E. Senn (born 1932), professor emeritus of history at the University of Wisconsin–Madison
Bill Senn (1905–1973), professional American football running back in the National Football League
Chris Senn (skateboarder) (born 1972), professional skateboarder, known for his aggressive and spontaneous style
Chris Senn (video game designer), video game designer perhaps best known for his work on Sonic X-Treme (Sega)
Daniel Senn (born 1983), Swiss footballer
Deborah Senn, Washington politician
Frank Senn (born 1943), American Lutheran pastor and liturgiologist
Franz Senn (1831–1884), pastor, whose concern for the poverty of his parishioners lead him to encourage tourism into the Stubai
Gustav Senn (1875–1945), Swiss botanist
Hans Senn (1918–2007), general officer of the Swiss Army
Jean Antoine Petit-Senn (1792–1870), poet of French-Swiss origin
Johann Senn (1795–1857), political lyric poet of the Vormärz
Jordan Senn (born 1984), American football linebacker
Mark Senn (1878–1951), Conservative and Progressive Conservative party member of the Canadian House of Commons
Nicholas Senn (1844–1908), surgeon, instructor, and founder of the Association of Military Surgeons of the United States
Nikolaus Senn (1926–2014), former co-director of Schweizerische Bankgesellschaft
Reinhold Senn (born 1936), Austrian luger who competed during the 1960s
Ricardo Senn (born 1931), retired track and road bicycle racer from Argentina
Thomas J. Senn, American naval officer and 1891 graduate of the United States Naval Academy

See also
Franz Senn Hut, alpine hut in the Stubai Alps owned by the Austrian Alpine Club
Senn High School, located on the North Side of Chicago in the Edgewater community
Senn retractor, double ended retractors used in surgical procedures

fr:Senn